Ormiston Venture Academy (formerly Oriel Specialist Mathematics and Computing College) is a secondary school with academy status located in Oriel Avenue, Gorleston in the English county of Norfolk. The school educates children aged 11 to 16. It is housed in a block constructed in 2008 and a second newer building that stands where the original building, constructed in 1954, was located. The present facility includes a new reception area, Learning Resource Centre, and classrooms; it was opened in March 2014 by alumnus Callum Cooke.

History

Originally named Great Yarmouth Technical High School, it was opened in 1954 to replace the old Technical High School located in Southtown. It has gone through many different names, including Oriel Grammar School, Oriel High School and Oriel Specialist Maths and Computing College. In c 2007, its houses were: Trinity, Magdalen, Girton and Pembroke. Previously, when the Technical High School and the Oriel Grammar School the houses were  Blue - Perebourne, Red - Fastolff, Yellow - Grenfell, and Green - Paget. Also Middleton were black and Nelson wearing white.

The current principal as of February 2013 is Simon Gilbert-Barnham. A new building was added to the site, by Net Zero Buildings, to accommodate the Humanities department. The school is sponsored by the Ormiston Academies Trust.

Gresham's Scholarship
The school has a connection with the privately-funded, boarding school Gresham's in Holt, North Norfolk – whereby one student per academic year is offered a fully-funded scholarship to study at Gresham's for two years. There have been 10 scholars so far.

References

External links
Official website

Educational institutions established in 1954
Academies in Norfolk
Gorleston-on-Sea
Secondary schools in Norfolk
1954 establishments in England
Ormiston Academies